Battle of Nukeib, called in Syria, Battle of Nairab Hill was a battle between the Syrian and Israeli forces at Tel al-Nairab in the village of Al-Nuqayb, located near the Sea of Galilee.

Battle 
Abd al-Karim al-Nahlawi, who planned and orchestrated the coup that caused Syria to split from the United Arab Republic, claimed on this battle that "Israel was assaulting Syria and fights were taking place between the Israelis and the Syrian outposts. In Tell al-Nairab in the town of al-Naqeeb, there was a Palestinian-populated area near to Lake Tiberias, and at the same time, Israel diverted Jordan's waters to the Negev in the south, so Syria was blocking them."

See also 
 1962 Syrian coup d'état attempt

References 

Israel Defense Forces
Battles involving Syria
1962 in Israel
1962 in Syria
March 1962 events in Asia